The following lists events that happened during 1898 in New Zealand.

Incumbents

Regal and viceregal
Head of State – Queen Victoria
Governor – The Earl of Ranfurly GCMG

Government and law
The 13th New Zealand Parliament continues with the Liberal Party in power.

Speaker of the House – Sir Maurice O'Rorke
Prime Minister – Richard Seddon
Minister of Finance – Richard Seddon
Chief Justice – Hon Sir James Prendergast

Parliamentary opposition
Leader of the Opposition –  William Russell.

Main centre leaders
Mayor of Auckland – Peter Dignan followed by David Goldie
Mayor of Christchurch – Walter Cooper followed by Charles Louisson
Mayor of Dunedin – Edward Bowes Cargill followed by William Swan
Mayor of Wellington – John Rutherford Blair

Events 
 1 December W H Bartlett filmed the opening of the Auckland Industrial and Mining Exhibition. 
 Christmas Eve, the opening screened at Bartlett's studio – the first public screening of a New Zealand film.

Arts and literature

Music

Sport

Athletics
National Champions, Men:
100 yards – George Smith (Auckland)
250 yards – Alfred J. Patrick (Wellington)
440 yards – R. Oliphant (Auckland)
880 yards – H. C. Garsia (Canterbury)
1 mile – S. Pentecost (Canterbury)
3 miles – S. Pentecost (Canterbury)
120 yards hurdles – Arthur H. Holder (Wanganui)
440 yards hurdles – George Smith (Auckland)
Long jump – Alan Good (Wanganui)
High jump – Hugh Good (Wanganui)
Pole vault – Hori Eruera (Auckland)
Shot put – Hugh Good (Wanganui)
Hammer throw – J. Skinner (Auckland)

Chess
National Champion:
 R.J. Barnes of Wellington. (Played over new year 1897/98)
 R.A. Cleland of Dunedin (played December 1898)

Cricket

Golf
The National Amateur Championships were held in Christchurch
 Men – W. Pryde (Hutt)
 Women – K. Rattray (Otago)

Horse racing

Harness racing
 Auckland Trotting Cup (over 2 miles) is won by Duke C.

Thoroughbred racing
 New Zealand Cup – Tirant D’eau
 New Zealand Derby – Altair
 Auckland Cup – Uhlan - the first horse-race to be filmed in New Zealand
 Wellington Cup – Uniform

Season leaders (1897/98)
Top New Zealand stakes earner – Multiform
Leading flat jockey – W. Brown

Lawn Bowls
National Champions
Singles – W. McIlwrick (Dunedin)
Pairs – C. Nicholson and W. McLaren (skip) (Kaitangata)
Fours – W. Cowie, C. Fynmore, M. Sinclair and A. Gillies (skip) (Dunedin)

Polo
Savile Cup winners – Oroua

Rowing
National Champions (Men)
Single sculls – J. McGrath (Otago)
Double sculls – Otago
Coxless pairs – Wellington
Coxed fours – Picton

Rugby union
Provincial club rugby champions include:
see also :Category:Rugby union in New Zealand

Shooting
Ballinger Belt – Private J. McGregor (Oamaru Rifles)

Soccer
Provincial league champions:
	Auckland:	Auckland United
	Otago:	Wakari Dunedin
	Wellington:	Wellington Rovers

Swimming
National champions (Men)
100 yards freestyle – A. Truscott (Canterbury)
440 yards freestyle – C. Rich (Canterbury)

Tennis
National champions
Men's singles – J. Hooper
Women's singles – Kathleen Nunneley
Men's doubles – H. Parker and C. Gore
Women's doubles – Kathleen Nunneley and E. Kennedy

Births

 8 October: George Davidson, Olympic sprinter.

Deaths
 2 January: John Cargill, politician (born 1821). 
 3 May: John Kerr, politician (born 1830). 
 29 June: Charles Parker, politician (born 1809).
 15 July: Francis Dillon Bell, politician (born 1822).
 31 October: William Gilbert Rees, explorer and settler (born 1827).
 25 November: William Downie Stewart, politician (born 1842).
 29 November: Thomas Forsaith, politician (born 1814).

See also
List of years in New Zealand
Timeline of New Zealand history
History of New Zealand
Military history of New Zealand
Timeline of the New Zealand environment
Timeline of New Zealand's links with Antarctica

References
General
 Romanos, J. (2001) New Zealand Sporting Records and Lists. Auckland: Hodder Moa Beckett. 
Specific

External links